Za'atara is a Palestinian town located  southeast of Bethlehem. The town is in the Bethlehem Governorate central West Bank. According to the Palestinian Central Bureau of Statistics, the town had a population of over 6,289 in 2007.

History
In the wake of the 1948 Arab–Israeli War, and after the 1949 Armistice Agreements, Za’atara came under  Jordanian rule.

In 1961, under Jordanian rule, the population of Za'atara was 1,003.

Post−1967
Since the Six-Day War in 1967, Za'atara has been held under Israeli occupation. 1,282 people were counted in the Israeli government's 1967 census.

After the 1995 accords, 0.9% of  Za'atara land was classified as Area A, 44% classified as Area B, and 32.6% classified as Area C, while the remaining 22.5% is defined as "nature reserves". Israel has confiscated 20 dunams of village land for the Israeli settlement of El David and 10 dunams for an Israeli Military Base.

References

Bibliography

External links
Welcome To Za'tara
Za’atara, Welcome to Palestine
Za'tara town (fact sheet), Applied Research Institute–Jerusalem (ARIJ)
Za'tara town profile, ARIJ
Za'tara aerial photo, ARIJ
 The priorities and needs for development in Za'tara town based on the community and local authorities' assessment, ARIJ

Towns in the West Bank
Populated places in the Bethlehem Governorate
Municipalities of the State of Palestine